Cyperus foliaceus is a species of sedge that is endemic to parts of Africa.

The species was first formally described by the botanist Charles Baron Clarke in 1906.

See also
 List of Cyperus species

References

foliaceus
Taxa named by Charles Baron Clarke
Plants described in 1906
Flora of Zambia
Flora of Togo
Flora of Uganda
Flora of Ethiopia
Flora of Malawi
Flora of Kenya
Flora of Mozambique
Flora of Sudan
Flora of Tanzania